Chromomycin A3 (CMA3) or Toyomycin is an anthraquinone antibiotic glycoside produced by the fermentation of a certain strain of Streptomyces griseus (No. 7).



Fluorescence properties 
In the presence of Mg2+ ions, Chromomycin A3 binds reversibly to DNA, preferentially to contiguous G/C base pairs.

When bound to DNA, Chromomycin A3 has a maximum excitation wavelength of 445 nm (blue), and a maximum emission wavelength of 575 nm (yellow).

Uses 
 in-vitro membrane-impermeant G/C-specific fluorescent DNA-binding dye.
 in-vitro antibiotic of gram-positive bacteria, through inhibition of the incorporation of Pi in the RNA.
 in-vitro anticancer drug that inhibits RNA synthesis.
 Evaluation of male fertility: Chromomycin A3 and protamines compete for the same binding sites in the DNA, so CMA3 positivity in spermatozoa reflects protamine deficiency (affecting sperm morphology and decreasing fertility).

References 

Antibiotics
Anthraquinone glycosides